Friværdi is an album from the Danish band Magtens Korridorer.

Track listing
 "Vesterbro" – 3:17
 "Nordhavn Station" – 3:10
 "Lorteparforhold" – 3:18
 "Pisser På Plakaten" – 3:24
 "Picnic (På Kastellet)" – 3:36
 "Sara Har.." – 4:44
 "Tilt" – 3:15
 "Fnasksangen" – 3:35
 "Lørdag Formiddag" – 3:40
 "Leila Khaled" – 2:28
 "Døden Nær" – 4:28

Magtens Korridorer albums
2005 albums